Fahrenbach is a town in the district of Neckar-Odenwald-Kreis, in Baden-Württemberg, Germany.

Administration
Fahrenbach is made up of three subdivisions:
 Fahrenbach, population 1335
 Robern, population 699
 Trienz, population 808

References
 Official Web site

Neckar-Odenwald-Kreis